Stomiahykidae is an extinct family of prehistoric lungfishes which lived during the Devonian period.

Phylogeny
 Sarcopterygii (Class)
 Dipnoi (Subclass)
 Stomiahykidae (Family)
 †Archaeonectes (Genus)
 †Stomiakykus (Genus)

References 

Prehistoric lungfish
Prehistoric lobe-finned fish families
Devonian bony fish
Devonian first appearances
Devonian extinctions